Acrobasis minutalis is a species of snout moth in the genus Acrobasis. It was described by Jan Asselbergs in 2008 and is found in the United Arab Emirates.

References

Moths described in 2008
Acrobasis
Moths of Asia